Live at the Basement may refer to:

 Live at the Basement (Renée Geyer album), 1986
 Live at the Basement (Brother Henry album), 2004
 Live at the Basement (The Angels album), 2005